Scott Campbell Covington (born January 17, 1976) is a former American football quarterback. He played five seasons in the National Football League (NFL) for the Cincinnati Bengals and St. Louis Rams and one season in the Canadian Football League (CFL) for the Toronto Argonauts.

College
Covington played in college football at the University of Miami.   He was the starting quarterback for the Miami Hurricanes in 1997 after Ryan Clement suffered an injury in the middle of the season. Covington had an average college career, mostly serving as a backup for Clement. He did not earn a chance to start until his senior year in 1998, helping the Hurricanes to a 9–3 record, including a season defining win against the then #3 UCLA Bruins, 49–45, in the final regular season game.

NFL career
Covington was drafted in the 1999 NFL Draft by the Cincinnati Bengals, for whom he played with for three seasons. He spent the majority of those three seasons as the third-string quarterback, behind the likes of Akili Smith and Scott Mitchell. He appeared in just 3 games, completing 4 of 5 passes for 23 yards and running the ball twice for -4 yards. In 2002, he joined the St. Louis Rams, where he played for two seasons. He played in just one game, but he also started it in place of an injured Kurt Warner. He completed 2 of 5 passes for 7 yards and was sacked twice before being replaced by Jamie Martin. He was released during the 2004 offseason.

Post NFL career
After sitting out the entire 2004 season, Covington was signed by the Toronto Argonauts of the Canadian Football League (CFL) on March 1, 2005. He was released on June 18.

References

1976 births
Living people
American football quarterbacks
Cincinnati Bengals players
Miami Hurricanes football players
St. Louis Rams players
Sportspeople from Fresno, California